Robert B. Sofge Jr.  is a United States Marine Corps major general who is the Assistant Chief of Staff for Strategic Planning and Policy of the United Nations Command, ROK/US Combined Forces Command, and United States Forces Korea. He previously served as the Deputy Commander of the United States Marine Corps Forces Pacific.

References

External links

Year of birth missing (living people)
Living people
Place of birth missing (living people)
United States Marine Corps generals